Happy Jacks Dam is a major ungated concrete gravity dam across the Tumut River in the Snowy Mountains region of New South Wales, Australia. The dam's main purpose is for the generation of hydro-power and is one of the sixteen major dams that comprise the Snowy Mountains Scheme, a vast hydroelectricity and irrigation complex constructed in south-east Australia between 1949 and 1974 and now run by Snowy Hydro.

The impounded reservoir is called the Happy Jacks Pondage. The dam wall is immediately downstream of the confluence of Happy Jacks Creek and the Tumut River.

Location and features
Completed in 1959, Happy Jacks Dam is a major dam, located within the Snowy Valleys local government area. The dam was constructed by a consortium comprising Kaiser-Walsh-Perini-Raymond based on engineering plans developed by the United States Bureau of Reclamation under contract from the Snowy Mountains Hydroelectric Authority.

At 100% capacity the dam wall holds back  of water. The uncontrolled spillway is capable of discharging .

See also

 Kosciuszko National Park
 List of dams and reservoirs in New South Wales
 Snowy Hydro Limited
 Snowy Mountains Scheme
 Snowy Scheme Museum

Notes

References
 

Snowy Mountains Scheme
Gravity dams
Dams in New South Wales
Dams completed in 1959
Kosciuszko National Park
Murray-Darling basin